Hope is a given name derived from the Middle English hope, ultimately from the Old English word hopian referring to a positive expectation or to the theological virtue of hope. It was used as a virtue name by the Puritans. Puritans also used Hope as an element in phrase names, such as Hope-for, Hopeful, and Hope-still.

The name is also the usual English translation of the Greek name of Saint Hope, an early Christian child martyr who was tortured to death along with her sisters Faith and Charity. She is known as Elpis in Greek and Spes in Church Latin and her name is translated differently in other languages.

Faith, Hope and Charity, the three theological virtues, are names traditionally given to triplet girls, just as Faith and Hope remain common names for twin girls. There were 40 sets of twins named Faith and Hope born in the United States in 2009, the second most common name combination for twin girls. One example were the American triplets Faith, Hope and Charity Cardwell, who were born in 1899 in Texas and were recognized in 1994 by the Guinness Book of World Records as the world's longest lived triplets.

Hope has been among the top 1,000 names given to girls born in the United States since 1880 and has been among the top 500 since 1909. It was ranked as the 231st most popular name for girls born in 2011 in the United States, down from its peak ranking of No. 144 in 1999.

Notable people
 Hope Akpan (born 1991), English professional footballer
 Hope Anderson (born 1988), American beauty queen
 Hope Andrade (born 1949), American businesswoman, former Secretary of State of Texas
 Hope Cooke (born 1940), American socialite, former Queen Consort of the King of Sikkim
 Destiny Hope Cyrus (born 1992), American singer, songwriter, and actress, better known as Miley Cyrus
 Hope Davis (born 1964), American actress
 Hope Dworaczyk (born 1984), American Playboy model, TV host and reality television personality
 Hope Edelman (born 1964), American non-fiction author
Hope Tisdale Eldridge (1904–1991), American statistician, demographer
 Hope Emerson (1897–1960), American actress
 Hope Garber (1924–2005), Canadian actress and singer
 Hope Grant (1826–1875), British General
 Hope Hicks (born 1988), American pr executive, White House Director of Strategic Communications for President Trump
 Hope Holiday (born 1938), American actress
 Hope Goddard Iselin (1868–1970), American heiress and sportswoman
 Hope Jahren (born 1969), American geobiologist
 Hope Lange (1933–2003), American actress
 Hope Larson (born 1982), American illustrator and cartoonist
 Hope Loring (1894–1959), English screenwriter
 Hope McIntyre, Canadian playwright and artistic director
 Hope Munro (born 1981), Australian field hockey player
 Hope Muir, Canadian dancer, rehearsal director and teacher 
 Hope Mwesigye (born 1956), Ugandan lawyer and politician
 Hope A. Olson (born 1942), American Information studies scholar
 Hope Partlow (born 1988), American pop singer
 Hope Powell (born 1966), English international football coach and former player
 Hope Rippey (born 1976), one of the perpetrators of the torture-murder of Shanda Sharer
Hope Rugo, American oncologist and professor of medicine
 Hope Sabanpan-Yu, Philippine story writer and poet
 Hope Sandoval (born 1966), American singer-songwriter
 Hope Skillman Schary (c. 1908–1981), American textile designer
 Hope Harmel Smith, American television producer and writer
 Hope Elizabeth Soberano (born 1998), Philippine actress
 Hope Solo (born 1981), member of the United States women's national soccer team
 Hope Summers  (1896–1979), American actress
Hope Thompson, Canadian writer
 Hope Hill Van Beuren, American billionaire
 Hope Morgan Ward (born 1951), American Methodist bishop
Hope Winch (1894–1944), English pharmacist

Fictional characters
 Hope Williams Brady, a character on the American soap opera, Days of Our Lives
 Hope Estheim, main male child character from the video game, Final Fantasy XIII, and recurring in its sequels, Final Fantasy XIII-2 and Lightning Returns: Final Fantasy XIII
 Hope Logan, a character on the American soap opera, The Bold and the Beautiful
 Hope Manning-Thornhart, a child character on the American soap opera, One Life to Live
 Hope Pym, a supervillain and superhero in Marvel Comics 2 and the Marvel Cinematic Universe, first appearing in A-Next in 1999.
 Hope Summers, a superhero in Marvel Comics, first appearing in X-Men in 2007
 Hope Adams Wilson, a former character on the American soap opera, The Young and the Restless
 Hope Mikaelson, a character on CW's show The Originals
Hope Stape, a child character on English soap Coronation Street
 Hope Swan Jones, a character on show Once Upon a Time
Hope, new supporting character of Siren in which she is the daughter of mermaid Ryn. She debuts in "Life and Death" and returns in "A Voice in the Dark"
Hope Quentin Wicker-Adiyodi, a baby character on SyFy's show The Magicians, daughter of Julia Wicker and William "Penny" Adiyodi
Hope Diyoza, daughter of Charmaine Diyoza that first appeared in Season 6 Finale of The 100 (TV series) & then as a regular in Season 7
Hope Bennett, a character on the TV show, "The Walking Dead: World Beyond"

Notes

English feminine given names
English masculine given names
English-language unisex given names
Virtue names

pl:Nadzieja (imię)